The 10th Houston Film Critics Society Awards nominations were announced on December 12, 2016. The ceremony was held on January 6, 2017.

Winners and nominees 
Winners are listed first and highlighted with boldface.

Movies with multiple nominations and awards

The following films received multiple nominations:

The following films received multiple awards:

References

External links 
 Houston Film Critics Society: Awards

2016
2016 film awards
2016 in Texas
Houston